Mississauga Music Walk of Fame was established in 2012 by late Councillor Jim Tovey in Memorial Park in Port Credit, Mississauga, Ontario, to recognize musical talent that have their origins in the Ontario city. It was launched during the Southside Shuffle music festival.

Inductees
2012
 Ronnie Hawkins
 Gil Moore, Triumph, owner of MetalWorks recording studio
 Krisztina Szabo
 Oscar Peterson, posthumously

2013
 Eleanor Calbes, opera singer
 Charlie Camilleri, Canadian music industry pioneer
 Rik Emmett, Triumph guitarist
 Chuck Jackson, Southside Blues and Jazz founder, Downchild Blues Band
 Nancy Walker, jazz pianist

2014
 Billy Talent
 Joey Cee, music promoter 
 Ron Harrison, film and television composer
 Tommy Hunter

2015
 John Bride, guitarist
 Neill Dixon, manager
 Denny Doherty, The Mamas and The Papas
 Rob Wells, writer/producer

2016
 Bobby Dean Blackburn
 Steve Demarchi
 Jeff Healey
 Cliff Hunt

2017
 Fito Blanko
 Randy Lennox
 Alex Pangman
 Liberty Silver
2018

 Jim Tovey

2019

 Phil X
 Prakash John

2020

 Patti Jannetta

References

External links 
 Jason Spencer, "Music legends enshrined in Walk of Fame", Mississauga News, September 8, 2012.
 Official Website

Culture of Mississauga
Walks of fame